Triarthriini is a tribe of flies in the family Tachinidae. Some workers place members of this tribe in Loewiini.

Genera
Triarthria Stephens, 1829
Cucuba Richter, 2008

References

Brachyceran flies of Europe
Brachycera tribes
Tachininae